The Chairperson of the African Union is the ceremonial head of the African Union (AU) elected by the Assembly of Heads of State and Government for a one-year term. It rotates among the continent's five regions.

A candidate must be selected by consensus or at least two-thirds majority vote by member states. The chairperson is expected to complete the term without interruption; hence countries with impending elections may be ineligible.

The current Chairperson is Comorian President Azali Assoumani. Both Algeria and Morocco are vying for the position in 2024.

History

In 2002, South African President Thabo Mbeki served as the inaugural chairman of the union. The post rotates annually amongst the five geographic regions of Africa; and over the years it has assumed the following order: East, North, Southern, Central and West Africa.

In January 2007, the assembly elected Ghanaian President John Kufuor over Sudan's President Omar al-Bashir due to the ongoing conflict in Darfur. Amnesty International said it would undermine African Union's credibility and Chad threatened to withdraw its membership. Western governments also lobbied against Sudan and suggested Tanzania as a compromise candidate from the East African region. By consensus, Ghana was elected instead as it was celebrating its 50th independence anniversary that year.

In January 2010, Libyan Leader Muammar Gaddafi unsuccessfully tried to extend his tenure by an additional year, saying more time was needed in order to implement his vision for a United States of Africa - of which he was a strong proponent. Libya was at the time one of the largest financial supporters of the AU. Malawi was chosen instead.

The election of Equatoguinean President Teodoro Obiang Nguema Mbasogo in January 2011 was criticized by human rights activists as it undermined the AU's commitment to democracy.

Congolese Republic President Denis Sassou Nguesso and Zimbabwean President Robert Mugabe have both led the AU and its predecessor, the Organisation of African Unity during the terms 1986–88 and 2006–07, and 1997–98 and 2015–16 respectively. 

In 2023, both Kenya and Comoros were vying for the position. Comorian President Azali Assoumani thanked Kenyan President William Ruto  for his country's withdrawal.

Role
The incumbent chairs the biannual summit meetings of the assembly and represents the continent in various international fora such as G7, TICAD, FOCAC and G20 summits.

They also assist in resolving crises on the continent as an elder statesman. It has been suggested that liaison offices be established to prevent friction between the incumbent and the Commission Chairperson at the headquarters in Addis Ababa.

Elder Statesman
In 2008, following Kenya's post-election crisis, AU Chairman Jakaya Kikwete was instrumental in facilitating the opposing sides to agree to a Government of National Unity. Kikwete also backed the invasion of Anjouan by sending an AU Force to assist the Comoros federal government to remove renegade leader Mohamed Bacar.

List of Chairpersons

Bureau
The Chairperson is assisted by a bureau of four vice chairpersons including a rapporteur.

References

External links
 Official website